London Brew is the debut album by London Brew, a band consisting of a dozen British jazz musicians including Nubya Garcia, BBC Radio 1 presenter Benji B, and multiple members of Sons of Kemet and the Invisible. The album is set for release on 31 March 2023.

Background 
The band was assembled by producer and guitarist Martin Terefe and executive producer Bruce Lampcov for a series of concerts in major cities across Europe, starting with one at the Barbican Centre celebrating the 50th anniversary of Miles Davis' Bitches Brew which was cancelled due to the COVID-19 pandemic.

In place of the concert, the group assembled at the Church Studios in North London in December 2020, starting five days after the end of the UK's second COVID-19 lockdown, to record the album, an improvised set inspired by Bitches Brew. The recording took place over three days. The process started with pre-production work by Terefe and the Invisible's Dave Okumu, which Okumu described as Terefe sharing "a vision rooted in inspiration and celebration rather than faithful recreation". Benji B was brought in to feed Terefe's and Okumu's initial sketches to the ensemble. Okumu said the recording process was full of "so many special moments" such as "Shabaka and Nubya speaking to each other through their horns or Theon Cross dropping the heaviest bass line this side of lockdown."

Terefe, left with over 12 hours of material from the sessions, said he mixed them "like a non-jazz record" with "no editing at all, except deciding where to start and end a song", a decision he considered "the least conventional thing to do". Terefe called the results a "new piece of music that taps into Miles's mindset at the time and our emotion of having been through the pandemic", and said "calling the album 'Inspired by Bitches Brew comes the closest" to explaining it.

Release 
The album was announced 19 January 2023 along with the release of lead single "Miles Chases New Voodoo in the Church", an interpretation of Davis' Jimi Hendrix-inspired "Miles Runs the Voodoo Down", and is set for release by Concord Jazz on 31 March. The second single, "Raven Flies Low", was released March 9. It is said to match "rugged funk aspects in the beat to glorious melodies wrought from the effects-laden violin of Raven Bush." Terefe said that in mixing the track, he "fell into focusing on the continuous flow [of] Raven's violin melodies and electronic pedal orchestrations. His mini compositions moved so brilliantly under the radar and this one blew my mind. I chose the title inspired by the track 'John McLaughlin' on Bitches Brew. Simply a hats off to a maestro at work."

Track listing 
Sourced from Pitchfork.

Personnel 
Sourced from JamBase.
 Martin Terefe – producer, mixing engineer, guitarist
 Bruce Lampcov – executive producer
 Nubya Garcia – saxophone, flute
 Shabaka Hutchings – saxophone, woodwinds
 Tom Skinner – drums, percussion
 Benji B – decks, sonic recycling
 Theon Cross – tuba
 Raven Bush – violin, electronics
 Tom Herbert – electric bass, double bass
 Nikolaj Torp Larsen – synthesisers, melodica
 Nick Ramm – piano, synthesizers
 Dan See – drums, percussion
 Dave Okumu – guitar
 Glen Scott
 Lucinda Chao

References 

2023 debut albums
Jazz albums by British artists
Concord Music Group albums
Albums produced by Martin Terefe
Albums recorded at The Church Studios